Rotana Cinema is a Saudi Arabian free-to-air satellite television channel owned by Rotana Group network. It was launched in 2004, and broadcasts exclusively old and contemporary Egyptian films.

Rotana Cinema has the largest and richest Arabic movie library in the world; this channel broadcasts premium production films ranging from golden oldies to the latest blockbusters that have never been broadcast on TV, making it the first channel to use the direct-to-TV method by fast forwarding the period between a movie’s premier in theaters and the TV premier

Since 2005, Rotana Cinema has established itself as the Arab family's very own cinema at home and is set to continue solidifying that position through its 1000+ films not yet seen on TV and its exclusive premiers. The channel airs more than 35 premier movies per year directly from the cinema to the television.

Al Nashra Al Fanneya
Al Nashra Al Fanneya is a popular entertainment program in the Arab world and is considered the source of all the latest entertainment industry news in the region.
It provides the viewers with the latest news and updates on their favorite artists and the upcoming productions in both TV and Cinema.

Slogan

Its slogan, translated into English, means "you won't be able to blink your eyes". This slogan has become part of the Arab pop culture especially that the channel's ratings are the highest in the history of the Arab movie channels.

Logo

The logo has undergone periodic face-lifts since the channels launch

References

External links

Arabic-language television stations
Direct broadcast satellite services
Television stations in Saudi Arabia
Television stations in Egypt